The Africa Zone was the unique zone within Group 3 of the regional Davis Cup competition in 2018. The zone's competition was held in round robin format in Nairobi, Kenya, from 18 to 23 June 2018. The two winning nations won promotion to Group II, Europe/Africa Zone, for 2019.

Participating nations

Inactive nations

Draw
Date: 18–23 June

Location: Nairobi Club Ground, Nairobi, Kenya (clay)

Format: Round-robin basis. One pool of four teams (Pool A) and one pool of five teams (Pool B). The winners of each pool play-off against each other to determine which two nations are promoted to Europe/Africa Zone Group II in 2019.

Seeding

 1Davis Cup Rankings as of 9 April 2018

Pool A

Pool B 

Standings are determined by: 1. number of wins; 2. number of matches; 3. in two-team ties, head-to-head records; 4. in three-team ties, (a) percentage of sets won (head-to-head records if two teams remain tied), then (b) percentage of games won (head-to-head records if two teams remain tied), then (c) Davis Cup rankings.

Playoffs 

  and  promoted to Group II in 2019.

Round robin

Pool A

Benin vs. Cameroon

Nigeria vs. Rwanda

Benin vs. Rwanda

Nigeria vs. Cameroon

Benin vs. Nigeria

Rwanda vs. Cameroon

Pool B

Kenya vs. Uganda

Algeria vs. Namibia

Kenya vs. Mozambique

Namibia vs. Uganda

Algeria vs. Uganda

Namibia vs. Mozambique

Kenya vs. Namibia

Algeria vs. Mozambique

Kenya vs. Algeria

Mozambique vs. Uganda

Playoffs

Promotional playoffs

Benin vs. Kenya

Namibia vs. Nigeria

5th to 6th playoffs

Cameroon vs. Mozambique

7th to 8th playoffs

Rwanda vs. Algeria

References

External links
Official Website

Africa Zone Group III
Davis Cup Europe/Africa Zone